Bill Laimbeer's Combat Basketball is a futuristic basketball video game released by Hudson Soft for the Super Nintendo Entertainment System (SNES) in 1991. It was initially released in Europe under the name Future Basketball for the Amiga and Atari ST home computers in 1990. It was the first basketball game released for the SNES. The game stars Bill Laimbeer, who played for the Detroit Pistons of the NBA during a time when the team was notorious for aggressive and dirty, physical play.

The game takes place in the year 2031. Bill Laimbeer has become commissioner of a basketball league, fired the referees and created a style of play without rules. There are no fouls and use of weapons is perfectly legal.

Gameplay
The game utilizes an uncommon overhead view of the court. Unlike real basketball, players can physically check each other on the court without the threat of personal or team fouls. Destructive items such as bombs frequently appear on the court.

A season lasts 14 games without any playoff games. After each season, the top two teams in each league advance to the league above, and the bottom two teams in each league get moved down to the league below. Ties are broken by beginning season standings. If two teams finish the season with the same record, the one that was ranked higher at the beginning of the season will be ranked highest. The player starts out his career in the Third Division and must work his way up to the Super League; where the best teams vie for league supremacy.

Reception

Bret Alan Weiss, writing for Allgame, gave the game a negative review, criticizing the graphics, sounds and controls. Scoring the game one star out of five, he commented that these and other faults "mar what could have been a guilty pleasure." Game Informers Jeff Marchiafava had a more positive view of the game on his list of "Weirdest Celebrity-Based Video Games."

References

1991 video games
Basketball video games
Fantasy sports video games
Hudson Soft games
North America-exclusive video games
Super Nintendo Entertainment System games
Super Nintendo Entertainment System-only games
Video games set in 2031
Multiplayer and single-player video games
Video games about cloning
Video games based on real people
Cultural depictions of basketball players
Cultural depictions of American men